Matthew Luhn is an American writer, story consultant, animator, director, creative writing instructor and keynote speaker known for creating stories and characters, most notably at Pixar and The Simpsons.

Career
Luhn attended the character animation program at the California Institute of the Arts, and after his first-year student film, he was offered his first animation job. Dropping out of CalArts, Luhn's career began at 19 years old, as the youngest animator to work on The Simpsons TV series. His work includes Kamp Krusty (1992), Lisa's Pony (1992), Homer Alone (1992), Colonel Homer (1992), Homer Defined (1992), and Burns Verkaufen der Kraftwerk (1992). Shortly thereafter, he joined Pixar Animation Studios, becoming one of the first 12 animators on the studio's feature film, Toy Story. After working on Toy Story, Luhn worked for the next twenty years at Pixar as a story artist and writer. Luhn currently works as a story consultant, director, and writer.

Alongside his story work in Hollywood, Luhn is also a keynote speaker who trains chief executive officers, marketing teams, directors and other professionals how to craft and tell stories for Fortune 500 companies, Academy Award-winning movies and corporate brands. Matthew also gave a TEDx Talk at the University of California, Santa Barbara.

Filmography
Toy Story (1995)
Toy Story 2 (1999)
Monsters, Inc. (2001)
Finding Nemo (2003)
Cars (2006)
Ratatouille (2007)
Up (2009)
Toy Story 3 (2010)
Monsters University (2013)
Toy Story of Terror (2013)
Toy Story That Time Forgot (2014)
Lou (2017)
Onward (2020)
Sprite Fright (2021)

References

External links
 
 Matthew Luhn Keynote Speaker Bio

American writers
American animators
Pixar people
Year of birth missing (living people)
Living people
American storyboard artists